The New Jersey Rockets were an indoor soccer team based in East Rutherford, New Jersey that played in the Major Indoor Soccer League for the 1981-82 season.  Their home arena was the Brendan Byrne Arena, now known as the Meadowlands Arena. One of the owners was Timothy Sullivan, who was later asked if he wanted to be a part-owner of the New Jersey Devils, to which he replied, "hockey is too big a risk."  The Rockets' average attendance for their one season of play was 6,565.

Head coaches
 Timo Liekoski (1981–1982)
 Ian Anderson (1982)

Defunct indoor soccer clubs in the United States
Major Indoor Soccer League (1978–1992) teams
Soccer clubs in New Jersey
Sports in East Rutherford, New Jersey
Association football clubs established in 1981
Association football clubs disestablished in 1982
1981 establishments in New Jersey
1982 disestablishments in New Jersey